Guiguinto station is a former railway station located on the North Main Line in Bulacan, Philippines. The station was once part of the line until its discontinuation in 1988. It is currently being rebuilt as part of the first phase of the North–South Commuter Railway. As part of the project, the old station will also be restored. The station is parallel to McArthur Highway, and it is near to the San Ildefonso Church and to the Municipal Hall.

History 

The station, then known as the Estacion de Guiguinto, was inaugurated in 1891. It was the first railway station serving Guiguinto. It is a notable historical landmark in the municipality. It was upon this site that the Katipuneros ambushed a train from Dagupan, killing six friars, including the parish priest of Guiguinto, Fr. Leocadio Sanchez, and a Spanish doctor.

The station was to be rebuilt as a part of the Northrail project, which involved the upgrading of the existing single track to an elevated dual-track system, converting the rail gauge from narrow gauge to standard gauge, and linking Manila to Malolos in Bulacan and further on to Angeles City, Clark Special Economic Zone and Clark International Airport. The project commenced in 2007, but was repeatedly halted then discontinued in 2011.

References

Philippine National Railways stations
Railway stations in Bulacan